Joique Dewayne Bell Jr. (born August 4, 1986) is a former American football running back. He played college football at Wayne State. Bell was signed by the Buffalo Bills as an undrafted free agent in 2010. He has also been a member of the Philadelphia Eagles, Indianapolis Colts, New Orleans Saints, Detroit Lions, and Chicago Bears.

College career
As a senior at Wayne State, Bell was the winner of the Harlon Hill Trophy, awarded to the Division II player of the year, after he rushed for 2,084 yards and 29 touchdowns in the 2009 season.

Professional career

Buffalo Bills
After going undrafted in the 2010 NFL Draft, Bell signed with the Buffalo Bills on April 29, 2010. On September 4, 2010, he was released by the Bills during final team cuts. Bell was signed to the Bills' practice squad on the following day.

Philadelphia Eagles
On September 21, 2010, the Philadelphia Eagles signed Bell off the Bills' practice squad. He was released by the Eagles on November 10, 2010.

Indianapolis Colts
Bell was claimed off waivers by the Indianapolis Colts on November 11, 2010. On December 15, 2010, Bell was released by the team.

Philadelphia Eagles (second stint)
One day after his release from the Colts, on December 16, 2010, Bell was signed to the Eagles' practice squad.

New Orleans Saints
Bell was signed off the Eagles' practice squad by the New Orleans Saints on January 5, 2011 before the playoffs began. He was released by the team on September 20, 2011, and re-signed to the Saints' practice squad the following day.

Detroit Lions
On December 26, 2011, Bell was signed by the Detroit Lions. He played his first game with the Lions on September 9, 2012, and appeared in all 16 games of the 2012 season, compiling 414 rushing yards on 82 carries (5.0 average) with three rushing touchdowns. He also hauled in 52 receptions for 485 yards; 28 of his receptions were for first downs.

He was re-signed by the Lions in April 2013. He again played all 16 games for Detroit, finishing with 650 rushing yards and eight rushing touchdowns. Bell also caught 53 passes for 547 yards, as he and teammate Reggie Bush, who had 54 receptions for 506 yards, became the first running back duo in NFL history to both top 500 rushing yards and 500 receiving yards in a season.

On March 11, 2014, he signed a two-year, $7 million contract extension with $4.3 million in guaranteed money. Combined with the second round tender he signed worth $2.187 million, he was under contract for three years and $9.3 million overall.

On February 16, 2016, Bell was released by the Detroit Lions.

Chicago Bears
On September 27, 2016, Bell was signed by the Chicago Bears. On October 24, he was released by the Bears.

Detroit Lions (second stint)
The Detroit Lions re-signed Bell on December 6, 2016, after starting running back Ameer Abdullah suffered a fractured foot.

NFL career statistics

Regular season

Postseason

Personal life
Bell was born in Benton Harbor, Michigan and majored in criminal justice at Wayne State. While a student at Wayne State, Bell worked as a security guard at the Detroit Lions' training camp. Bell graduated with his masters degree in Sports Administration on Dec. 10, 2016.

References

External links
 Detroit Lions bio
 Buffalo Bills bio
 Wayne State Warriors football bio

1986 births
Living people
People from Benton Harbor, Michigan
Players of American football from Michigan
American football running backs
Wayne State Warriors football players
Buffalo Bills players
Philadelphia Eagles players
Indianapolis Colts players
New Orleans Saints players
Detroit Lions players
Chicago Bears players
Ed Block Courage Award recipients